Cygan is a surname which means gypsy in Polish. Notable people with the surname include:

Bogusław Cygan (1964-2018), Polish footballer
John Cygan (1954-2017), American actor
Mieczysław Cygan (1921-2006), Polish military commander
Pascal Cygan (born 1974), French footballer
Thierry Cygan (born 1975), French footballer
Cygan, an android built in 1957

See also
Cygan, Łódź Voivodeship, Polish village

Polish-language surnames